Chayaphon Moonsri (formerly: Saengsuree Moonsri; แสงสุรีย์ มูลศรี; born 27 October 1985), known as Wanheng Menayothin (วันเฮง มีนะโยธิน) or Wanheng Kaiyanghadaogym is a Thai professional boxer who held the WBC mini-flyweight title from 2014 to 2020. As of January 2021, he is ranked as the world's third best active mini-flyweight by BoxRec, The Ring and the Transnational Boxing Rankings Board.

Early life and Muay Thai career 
Moonsri graduated with a Bachelor of Arts from Bangkokthonburi University. Prior to becoming a professional boxer, Menayothin was a Muay Thai fighter. Kaiyanghadaogym took up Muay Thai at 13 and he sustained his family with the money he earned from fighting. He went on to become a Lumpinee champion and a Thai national champion.

Boxing career 
Wanheng made his professional debut in January 2007. He won the WBC Youth  mini-flyweight title in his third fight. He later claimed two more secondary titles, with the WBC International Silver title and the WBC International title. In June 2011, Wanheng outpointed former world champion Florante Condes. On 31 May 2013, Moonsri defeated Raul Pusta Jr. by ninth-round technical knockout to retain the WBC International mini-flyweight title.

On 6 November 2014, Wanheng won his first world title when he defeated defending champion Oswaldo Novoa to win the WBC mini-flyweight title. Novoa was badly hurt by an overhand punch in the ninth round and he retired in the corner. Wanheng's promoter, Virat Vachirarattanawong, paid $175,000 dollars to host the fight, a rarely high purse for the weight class. In his sixth defense, Wanheng beat Melvin Jerusalem via unanimous decision (115–113, 114–113, 114–113). Two scorecards were swung by a point deduction Jerusalem received after he threw a low blow.

Undefeated World record 
On 2 May 2018, Wanheng equalled Floyd Mayweather Jr.'s 50–0 record by knocking out Panamanian opponent Leroy Estrada in the fifth round in a mandatory title defense.

On 29 August 2018, Wanheng eclipsed Mayweather, reaching 51–0 with a points win over Pedro Taduran.

On 31 May, 2019, Menayothin fought Tatsuya Fukuhara. Despite suffering a cut, Menayothin managed to outbox his opponent. In the eighth round, the cut was deemed too severe by the referee, who stopped the fight early, and went to the scorecards. Menayothin was leading on all three scorecards at the time, 79-73, 78-74 and 78-74, and was awarded the technical decision victory and retained his WBC mini-flyweight belt.

In his next fight, Menayothin defended his title against Simphiwe Khonco. The WBC champion won via unanimous decision.

First loss
On 27 November 2020, he faced the WBC's number three ranked contender, Panya Pradabsri, at the City Hall Ground in Nakhon Sawan, Thailand. After a closely contested fight Menayothin suffered the first defeat of his career, losing his WBC title via twelve-round unanimous decision. All three judges scored the bout 115–113 in favour of Pradabsri.

Wanheng faced Knockout CP Freshmart for WBA (Super) mini-flyweight title on July 20, 2022. He lost the fight by unanimous decision, with scores of 116-112, 119-109 and 117-111.

Professional boxing record

Muay Thai record

|-  style= "background:#fbb;"
| 10 May 2011 || Loss ||align=left| Phetmorakot Petchyindee Academy || Lumpinee Stadium || Bangkok, Thailand || Decision || 5 || 3:00
|-
|-  style="background:#cfc;"
| 2 Nov 2010|| Won ||align=left| Khunsuek P.N.Gym || Lumpinee Stadium ||  Bangkok, Thailand || Decision|| 5 || 3:00 
|-
|-  style="background:#cfc;"
| 13 Jul 2010|| Won ||align=left| Chaidet Sor.Sor.Suriya || Lumpinee Stadium ||  Bangkok, Thailand || TKO || 2 ||  
|-
|-  style="background:#fbb;"
| 5 Mar 2010|| Loss ||align=left| Khunsuek P.N.Gym ||  ||  Bangkok, Thailand || Decision|| 5 || 3:00 
|-
! style=background:white colspan=9 |
|-  style="background:#fbb;"
| 1 May 2009|| Loss ||align=left| Phetmorakot Teeded99  || Lumpinee Stadium || Bangkok, Thailand || Decision || 5 || 3:00
|-  style="background:#cfc;"
| 8 Dec 2008|| Won ||align=left| Jomhod Eminentair || Lumpinee Stadium || Bangkok, Thailand || Decision  || 5 || 3:00
|-
|-  style="background:#cfc;"
| 7 Dec 2007|| Won ||align=left| Nongnan Kiatpatum ||  Lumpinee Stadium ||  Bangkok, Thailand || Decision|| 5 || 3:00
|-  style="background:#cfc;"
| 22 Sep 2006|| Won ||align=left| Jomhod Eminentair || Lumpinee Stadium || Bangkok, Thailand || Decision  || 5 || 3:00
|-
! style=background:white colspan=9 |

|-  style="background:#fbb;"
| 29 Aug 2006 || Loss||align=left| Norasing Lukbanyai || Lumpinee Stadium|| Bangkok, Thailand || Decision || 5 || 3:00 

|-  style="background:#cfc;"
| 2 Jun 2006|| Won ||align=left| Khunponjew Siangsawanpanpa ||  Lumpinee Stadium ||  Bangkok, Thailand || Decision|| 5 || 3:00 
|-
! style=background:white colspan=9 |
|-  style="background:#cfc;"
| 22 Dec 2005|| Won ||align=left| Kaimukdam Pomkhwannarong ||  Rajadamnern Stadium ||  Bangkok, Thailand || Decision|| 5 || 3:00

|-  style="text-align:center; background:#fbb;"
| 26 Sep 2005 || Loss||align=left| Palangpon Piriyanoppachai || Onesongchai, Rajadamnern Stadium || Bangkok, Thailand || Decision || 5 || 3:00

|-  style="text-align:center; background:#fbb;"
| 19 Jul 2004 || Loss||align=left| Palangpon Piriyanoppachai || Onesongchai, Rajadamnern Stadium || Bangkok, Thailand || Decision || 5 || 3:00

|-  style="background:#fbb;"
| 18 Feb 2004|| Loss ||align=left| Weraburuthai Saksomshy  || Rajadamnern Stadium || Bangkok, Thailand || TKO || 5 || 3:00
|-  style="background:#fbb;"
| 30 Oct 2003|| Loss ||align=left| Luknimit Singklongsi || Rajadamnern Stadium || Bangkok, Thailand || Decision || 5 || 3:00
|-
|-
| colspan=9 | Legend:

References

External links

Wanheng Menayothin - Profile, News Archive & Current Rankings at Box.Live

1985 births
Living people
Wanheng Menayothin
Wanheng Menayothin
World Boxing Council champions
Wanheng Menayothin
Mini-flyweight boxers
World mini-flyweight boxing champions